Sara Johansson (born 23 January 1980) is a female footballer for Hammarby IF DFF and the Swedish national team.

Honours

Club 
 Djurgården/Älvsjö 
 Damallsvenskan (2): 2003, 2004

Footnotes

References

External links
 National Team Profile
 Club Profile

1980 births
Swedish women's footballers
Living people
Kristianstads DFF players
Damallsvenskan players
Djurgårdens IF Fotboll (women) players
Women's association football forwards
Sweden women's international footballers
IFK Kalmar players
2007 FIFA Women's World Cup players
2003 FIFA Women's World Cup players
People from Karlshamn
Sportspeople from Blekinge County